Welsh Hills is an unincorporated community in Granville, Licking County, Ohio. It was settled by Welsh immigrants and was founded in 1802.

References

Unincorporated communities in Licking County, Ohio
Unincorporated communities in Ohio